Christopher Millar may refer to:

Rat Scabies (born 1957), née Christopher Millar, musician
Chris Millar (born 1983), footballer

See also
Chris Miller (disambiguation)